Anelosimus is a cosmopolitan genus of cobweb spiders (Theridiidae), currently containing 74 species. Anelosimus is a key group in the study of sociality and its evolution in spiders (Aviles 1997). It contains species spanning the spectrum from solitary to highly social (quasisocial), with eight quasisocial species, far more than any other spider genus. Among these is the South American social species Anelosimus eximius, among the best studied social spider species.

The web of a colony of A. eximius can reach cover entire tree canopies and contain tens of thousands of individuals. Most of the highly social species live in lowland tropical forests, and all occur in the Americas. Other species, particularly those at higher altitudes in northern latitudes in the Americas and all non-American species appear to be solitary or sub-social. Social Anelosimus species are generally highly inbred and have female-biased sex ratios, with up to 10 females per male.

The social, subsocial, and solitary behavior of differing species within Anelosimus has been used to examine hypotheses of environmental pressures on social behavior, and inbreeding.  Subsociality as a trait seems to be conserved, despite the wide range of environments in which Anelosimus species live; all known solitary species within the genus belong to a single clade.  Sociality, however, has independently arisen several times.

Description
Anelosimus spiders have a notched red or brown band on their abdomen, which is dark when preserved in alcohol. Laterally, the abdomen has a white band and/or white blotches. Individuals in this genus lack a colulus.

Species

, the World Spider Catalog accepted the following species:

Anelosimus agnar Agnarsson, 2006 – Malaysia
Anelosimus amelie Agnarsson, 2009 – Comoro Is.
Anelosimus analyticus (Chamberlin, 1924) – USA, Mexico
Anelosimus andasibe Agnarsson & Kuntner, 2005 – Madagascar
Anelosimus arizona Agnarsson, 2006 – USA, Mexico
Anelosimus ata Agnarsson, Kuntner & Jencik, 2015 – Madagascar
Anelosimus baeza Agnarsson, 2006 – Mexico to Brazil
Anelosimus bali Agnarsson, 2012 – Bali
Anelosimus biglebowski Agnarsson, 2006 – Tanzania
Anelosimus buffoni Agnarsson, Kuntner & Jencik, 2015 – Madagascar
Anelosimus chickeringi Levi, 1956 – Mexico to Peru
Anelosimus chonganicus Zhu, 1998 – China
Anelosimus crassipes (Bösenberg & Strand, 1906) – China, Korea, Japan, Ryukyu Is.
Anelosimus darwini Agnarsson, Kuntner & Jencik, 2015 – Madagascar
Anelosimus decaryi (Fage, 1930) – Aldabra, Madagascar, Comoro Is.
Anelosimus dialeucon (Simon, 1890) – Aden
Anelosimus domingo Levi, 1963 – Colombia to Suriname and Peru
Anelosimus dubiosus (Keyserling, 1891) – Brazil
Anelosimus dubius (Tullgren, 1910) – Tanzania
Anelosimus dude Agnarsson, 2006 – Tanzania
Anelosimus eidur Agnarsson, 2012 – New Guinea
Anelosimus elegans Agnarsson, 2006 – Mexico to Peru
Anelosimus ethicus (Keyserling, 1884) – Brazil
Anelosimus exiguus Yoshida, 1986 – China, Japan, Ryukyu Is.
Anelosimus eximius (Keyserling, 1884) (type species) – Lesser Antilles, Panama to Argentina
Anelosimus fraternus Bryant, 1948 – Hispaniola
Anelosimus guacamayos Agnarsson, 2006 – Ecuador
Anelosimus hookeri Agnarsson, Kuntner & Jencik, 2015 – Madagascar
Anelosimus huxleyi Agnarsson, Veve & Kuntner, 2015 – Madagascar
Anelosimus inhandava Agnarsson, 2005 – Brazil, Argentina
Anelosimus iwawakiensis Yoshida, 1986 – Korea, Japan
Anelosimus jabaquara Levi, 1956 – Brazil
Anelosimus jucundus (O. Pickard-Cambridge, 1896) – Mexico to Argentina
Anelosimus kohi Yoshida, 1993 – Malaysia, Singapore
Anelosimus lamarcki Agnarsson & Goh, 2015 – Madagascar
Anelosimus linda Agnarsson, 2006 – Malaysia
Anelosimus lorenzo Fowler & Levi, 1979 – Brazil, Paraguay, Uruguay, Argentina
Anelosimus luckyi Agnarsson, 2012 – New Guinea
Anelosimus may Agnarsson, 2005 – Madagascar
Anelosimus membranaceus Zhang, Liu & Zhang, 2011 – China
Anelosimus misiones Agnarsson, 2005 – Argentina
Anelosimus monskenyensis Agnarsson, 2006 – Kenya
Anelosimus moramora Agnarsson, Kuntner & Jencik, 2015 – Madagascar
Anelosimus nazariani Agnarsson & Kuntner, 2005 – Madagascar
Anelosimus nelsoni Agnarsson, 2006 – South Africa
Anelosimus nigrescens (Keyserling, 1884) – Guyana, Brazil
Anelosimus octavius Agnarsson, 2006 – Mexico to Costa Rica
Anelosimus oritoyacu Agnarsson, 2006 – Mexico to Ecuador
Anelosimus pacificus Levi, 1956 – Mexico to Costa Rica, Jamaica
Anelosimus pantanal Agnarsson, 2006 – Brazil
Anelosimus placens (Blackwall, 1877) – Seychelles
Anelosimus pomio Agnarsson, 2012 – New Britain
Anelosimus potmosbi Agnarsson, 2012 – New Guinea
Anelosimus pratchetti Agnarsson, 2012 – New South Wales
Anelosimus pulchellus (Walckenaer, 1802) – Europe to Russia, Iran, North Africa
Anelosimus puravida Agnarsson, 2006 – Guatemala to Panama
Anelosimus rabus Levi, 1963 – Brazil
Anelosimus rupununi Levi, 1956 – Trinidad to Brazil
Anelosimus sallee Agnarsson & Kuntner, 2005 – Madagascar
Anelosimus salut Agnarsson & Kuntner, 2005 – Madagascar
Anelosimus seximaculatus (Zhu, 1998) – China
Anelosimus studiosus (Hentz, 1850) – USA to Argentina
Anelosimus subcrassipes Zhang, Liu & Zhang, 2011 – China
Anelosimus sulawesi Agnarsson, 2006 – Sulawesi
Anelosimus sumisolena Agnarsson, 2005 – Brazil
Anelosimus taiwanicus Yoshida, 1986 – Taiwan, Krakatau
Anelosimus terraincognita Agnarsson, 2012 – possibly Australasia
Anelosimus tita Agnarsson, Kuntner & Jencik, 2015 – Madagascar
Anelosimus torfi Agnarsson, 2015 – Madagascar
Anelosimus tosus (Chamberlin, 1916) – Mexico to Peru
Anelosimus vierae Agnarsson, 2012 – Uruguay
Anelosimus vittatus (C. L. Koch, 1836) – Palearctic
Anelosimus vondrona Agnarsson & Kuntner, 2005 – Madagascar
Anelosimus wallacei Agnarsson, Veve & Kuntner, 2015 – Madagascar

References

Theridiidae
Araneomorphae genera
Cosmopolitan spiders